V Televisión was a Spanish commercial television channel owned by the Corporación Voz de Galicia. The channel was launched on 29 May 2010 The channel broadcast in the two languages of Galicia, Galician and Spanish.

References

External links
 Official site

Television stations in Galicia (Spain)
Spanish-language television stations
Mass media in Santiago de Compostela
Television channels and stations established in 2010
Galician-language television stations